A chip is a terminology to describe a stock of a particular quality.

Chip

Share

Stock market